The saw-wings, Psalidoprocne, is a small genus of  passerine birds in the swallow family. The common name of this group is derived from the rough outer edge of the outer primary feather on the wing, which is rough due to recurved barbs. The function of this is unknown. The birds are 11–17 cm long and black or black-and-white in colour. The genus has an African distribution and all species can be found foraging over forest and woodland.
The last part of their scientific name comes from the eldest daughter of King Pandion of Athens, Procne, who was turned into a swallow after tricking her abusive husband.

Species list
There are at least five species of saw-wing. The black saw-wing has a large number of subspecies and many of these are sometimes considered to be separate species. The species, in taxonomic order, are:

References

External links